Giuseppe Testa (30 June 1819, Martina Franca – 14 December 1894, Naples) was an Italian surgeon.

He studied in Naples where he graduated in medicine and surgery at the age of 21.

He was well known for the successful surgical operation on Carlo Filangieri's leg, saving him from a gangrene which would have brought certain amputation. His surgical clinic became the most important in Naples, it was attended by many students and in 1876 he became a professor of surgery at Naples University.

Testa was also a member of the "Medical-Surgical Royal Academy".

References
 M. Fumarola, La Chiesa del Carmine di Martina Franca, 1981, Fasano di Brindisi, pp. 74–94
 Marinò Angelo, Repertorio bio-bibliografico degli scrittori, artisti e scienziati martinesi, 1970, Martina Franca, pp. 84–88
 Rapolla Testa Armando, Cenni sulla vita ed opere di Giuseppe testa, 1819–1894, 1967, Martina Franca, pp. 3–5

Italian surgeons
19th-century Neapolitan people
People from Martina Franca
1819 births
1894 deaths
Academic staff of the University of Naples Federico II